Tor Henriksen  (16 May 1933 – 1 November 2017) was a Norwegian politician for the Socialist Left Party.

He was born in Gamvik to Karl Johan Henriksen and Anna Isaksen. He was elected representative to the Storting for the period 1973–1977.

References

1933 births
2017 deaths
People from Gamvik
Socialist Left Party (Norway) politicians
Members of the Storting